Joe Goode (born 1937) is an American artist who attended the Chouinard Art Institute in Los Angeles from 1959–1961. Originally born in Oklahoma City, Oklahoma, Goode made a name for himself in Los Angeles through his cloud imagery and milk bottle paintings which were associated with the Pop Art movement. The artist is also closely associated with Light and Space, a West coast movement of the early 1960s. He currently creates and resides in Los Angeles, California.

Early life 
Joe Goode was born on March 23, 1937, in the middle of the Great Plains of Oklahoma immediately following the Dust Bowl and at the tail end of The Great Depression. He has a younger brother named Dick who was born just twelve months after. Goode and his brother were raised Catholic as his father, William Goode, had wished. Though his parents divorced when Goode was eleven years old, his father had a great influence on his artistry.

He too was an artist who made signage for a department store in town and painted portraits. The two would sketch various actors on screen when the family got a television and Goode would attempt to emulate his father’s ability to capture likenesses.

During the summer Goode’s mother would ship him and his brother off to visit their grandparents on a ranch in Arlington, Texas. Goode explains that the perceived leisure quickly turned into child labor as the Goode boys were put to work picking potatoes on Sproull’s Ranch.

Joe Goode had little ambition and little cultural exposure as a child, but upon graduating high school his interests in the unknown world around him began to peak which compelled him to move to Los Angeles. He lived with four other Oklahomans and shortly after enrolled in Chouinard Art Institute marking the start of his artistic career.

Early career 
In December 1959, Goode traveled to Los Angeles, California, from Oklahoma and began to make his name in the burgeoning Los Angeles art scene. He embraced American Pop Art and became part of a group of young artists living and working in California. This group included notable artists such as Ken Price, Ed Kienholz, and Ronald Davis.

The American Pop scene had a fascination with modern consumer culture and utilized the subject matter in many of their works. Goode and his contemporaries were also interested in graphic images, like those being created at Gemini Ltd. (now Gemini G.E.L.), a company dedicated to collaborating with artists to produce prints, lithographs, and other graphic art.

During his early career, Goode worked alongside Gemini Ltd. to produce his own prints. Cloud and Self Portrait, both created in 1965, were the first two pieces he made at Gemini. In 1967, he completed the English still life series, a series of shifting glasses and spoons.

Exhibitions

"The New Paintings of Common Objects" 
In 1962, Joe Goode was exhibited alongside artists such as Andy Warhol, Roy Lichtenstein, and Edward Ruscha at The Pasadena Art Museum (now Norton Simon Museum) in California. The exhibition, "The New Paintings of Common Objects," was an early display of the art movement eventually referred to as Pop Art. “Common Objects” was curated by Walter Hopps and is considered the first museum show in the United States to exhibit Pop Art. This show featured Goode's paintings, Milk Bottle Painting (Green) and Milk Bottle Painting (Two-Part Blue). Composed of thickly painted canvases and milk bottles, Goode's two works draw inspiration from Surrealism and Assemblage. They exemplify a specific feeling of small-town America, with the placement of the milk bottle on the floor and the canvas hung low, reminding one of milk left on a doorstep. The paintings also invite a sense of loneliness, providing extra commentary on life in a small town.

"How The West Has Done! A Wild Wild West Show" 
1966 saw Goode’s inclusion in an exhibition entitled How The West Has Done! A Wild Wild West Show, in Philadelphia, Pennsylvania, hosted by the Arts Council and curated by Audrey Sabol. The exhibition explored the art being created on the West Coast and brought to light the self-contained nature of the California Art Scene.

Other exhibitions and shows 
Goode has been exhibiting his work in group and solo exhibitions since 1960. His very first group show, two years prior to "The New Paintings of Common Objects," took place in Oklahoma City at the Oklahoma Art Center. His first solo exhibition took place in 1962 in Los Angeles, CA, at the Dilexi Gallery.

From 2015 to 2021 Goode exhibited in four solo shows, two of which were held at the Peter Blake Gallery (2016 and 2018). His other two solo exhibits were held at the Kohn Gallery in 2021 and the KOKI ARTS gallery in Tokyo Japan (2015). Meanwhile, he participated in group shows throughout California from 2012 until the present. In 2022, Goode's work was a part of the exhibition, "Dissolve," at the Jack and Shanaz Langson Institute and Museum of California Art at the University of California, Irvine.

On average, his paintings sell for $109,000, his print work sells for $2,000, and his works on paper sell for $6,000.

Style 
Goode’s style vacillates between both traditional and non-traditional forms of media which allows him to tow the line between representational art and abstraction. His use of media also lends to a deeper exploration of differing ways of seeing the world. Examples of this are his milk bottles that act as a lens atop a field of color. This object also exemplified his affinity for simplistic, unassuming subject matter. His tendency of rending or tearing away a superficial canvas to expose another painting below also furthered this desire to show a different way of seeing the world.

His early works draw inspiration from artists such as Robert Irwin, who taught Goode at the Chouinard Art Institute. The minimalism of the milk bottle paintings was reminiscent of Irwin's canvases and the art of his Los Angeles contemporaries, who were experimenting with both pop art and minimalist abstraction. Additionally, a 1962 screwdriver lithograph of Goode's has direct parallels to the work of Jasper Johns, another one of Goode's influences.

Individual works

Milk Bottles 
Beginning in 1961 and considered to be his first significant body of work, the Milk Bottles series consisted of fourteen, low-hanging abstract canvases of color with the faint outline of a milk bottle on the canvas. Outside of the canvas bounds, Goode would place a tangible milk bottle that overlapped the one on the canvas and was also covered in paint. The artist describes coming home one morning after working a night shift and seeing milk bottles on his doorstep waiting for the milkman to collect. This moment inspired the series. He explains that, he sought to "activate" the space beyond the canvas and rather than creating some kind of three dimensional object to represent the milk bottle it made the most sense to simply use the actual object. Prior to these large scale paintings he was creating small drawings marking a dramatic shift in his art making. Goode speaks on a specific painting in this series called Leroy thatmeasured roughly ten feet with three milk bottles represented. Due to its sheer size it had to be destroyed because the artist could not fit the painting into his studio.

The series in its entirety is a hybrid of Minimalism and Pop Art. Though Good did not specifically associate himself with the Pop Art movement, he didn't mind being labeled so. By toeing the line of painting or sculpture, two-dimensional or three, this series embodied Conceptualism as well. It paved the way for two solo exhibitions and the 1962 "New Painting of Common Objects" exhibit which is said to have launched his career. Furthermore, in November 1962, the piece titled, Untitled Milk Bottle (Purple) graced the cover of Artforum.

Staircases 
Joe Goode created his Staircases series starting in 1964 and was inspired by the ready-mades of Marcel Duchamp and the staircases in the musicals of Busby Berkley. These works are physical staircases that lead to nothing, usually propped against a wall. Made up of wood and cheap carpeting, these staircases, like the Milk Bottles series, evoke a feeling of suburban, small-town America. The placement of the works makes the wall an integral part of the work, providing a dead, empty space for the staircase to lead into, and creating an advance and retreat quality for the viewer.

Goode's Staircases vary in size, with one of the largest being around nine-feet high. This massive staircase, along with two others, was created in Germany with the help of an art dealer named Hans Neuendorf. Neuendorf's brother was a carpenter and assisted Goode in the construction of the work. Neuendorf himself was a big supporter of Goode and put up several shows in Germany exhibiting his work. Unfortunately, due to the size and weight of the nine-foot staircase, which made it hard to handle, it never was displayed again. In storage, it was mishandled and eventually destroyed.

However, some works from the Staircases series have survived and can now be found in the permanent collections of museums such as the Museum of Contemporary Art (MOCA) in Los Angeles, and the Museum of Modern Art (MoMA)in New York.

Clouds 
Clouds is thought to be the height of Goode's artistic career and the paintings in this series harken back to Romanticism. Within Clouds, there were three distinct variations. From 1967 to 1969 Goode produced his Photo Clouds series while Torn Clouds was produced from years 1970 to 1976 and Vandalized Clouds was simultaneously painted from 1971 to 1975. Each cluster dealt with the subject matter differently. Photo Clouds demonstrates a surreal quality, Torn Cloudsbegins to tear away at the canvas to reveal what's below, and Vandalized Clouds is sharply biting as the soft ethereal clouds are interrupted by deep slashes in the canvas down to the cardboard underneath.

Once again evoking childhood and suburban life, Goode's Clouds are reminiscent of the clouds seen when laying in a field, further eliciting an emotional reaction from the viewer. Additionally, the series as a whole plays with the idea that the sky is constantly changing, never staying in one place for long. Goode's intention with the Clouds series was to comment on the idea of transparency, something he touches on with the Milk Bottles series but is fully realized here.

Goode saw his Clouds series featured prominently by Hans Neuendorf in his galleries in Hamburg and Cologne, Germany. In 1971, Neuendorf displayed Goode's Photo Cloud paintings at his two galleries, and in 1972, the Torn Skypaintings were exhibited in Cologne.

Collections 

 American Federation of Arts, New York, New York
 Art Institute of Chicago, Chicago, Illinois
 Boise Art Museum, Boise, Idaho
 Cantor Art Center, Stanford University, Palo Alto, California
 Cedars-Sinai Medical Center, Los Angeles, California
 De Young (Anderson Gallery of Graphic Arts), San Francisco, California
 Donald Bren Foundation, Los Angeles, California
 Flint Institute of Arts, Flint, Michigan
 Fondation Carmignac, Paris, France
 Frederick R. Weisman Art Foundation, Los Angeles, California
 Grey Art Gallery of NYU, New York, New York
 Henry Art Gallery Collection, Seattle, Washington
 Honolulu Museum of Art, Honolulu, Hawaii
 Laguna Art Museum, Laguna Beach, California
 Los Angeles County Museum of Art, Los Angeles, California
 The Menil Collection, Houston, Texas
 Metropolitan Museum of Art, New York, New York
 Mildred Lane Kemper Art Museum, Washington University in St. Louis, Missouri
 Minneapolis Institute of Art, Minneapolis, Minnesota
 Moderna Museet, Stockholm, Sweden
 Museum of Contemporary Art, Los Angeles, California
 Museum of Contemporary Art, San Diego, California
 Museum of Fine Arts, Houston, Texas
 Museum of Modern Art, Jerusalem, Israel
 Museum of Modern Art, New York, New York
 Museums Sheffield, Sheffield, England
 National Gallery of Art, Washington, D.C.
 National Gallery of Australia, Parkes, Australia
 National Gallery of Canada, Ottawa, Canada
 National Gallery of Victoria, Melbourne, Australia
 New Mexico Museum of Art, Santa Fe, New Mexico
 Norton Simon Museum, Pasadena, California
 The Oakland Museum, Oakland, California
 Oklahoma City Museum of Art, Oklahoma City, Oklahoma
 Oklahoma State Art Collection, Oklahoma City, Oklahoma
 Orange County Museum of Art, Newport Beach, California
 Orlando Museum of Art, Orlando, Florida
 Pomona College Art Museum, Claremont, California
 Portland Art Museum, Portland, Oregon
 Rhode Island School of Design, Providence, Rhode Island
 Saint Louis Art Museum, St. Louis, Missouri
 San Diego Museum of Art, San Diego, California
 San Francisco Museum of Modern Art, San Francisco, California
 Santa Barbara Museum of Art, Santa Barbara, California
 Smithsonian Institution / Hirshhorn Museum, Washington D.C.
 Taubman Museum, Roanoke, Virginia
 UBS Art Collections, Zurich, Switzerland
 University of Kentucky Art Museum, Lexington, Kentucky
 University of Oklahoma, Norman, Oklahoma
 Victoria and Albert Museum, London, England
 Walker Art Center, Minneapolis, Minnesota
 Whitney Museum of American Art, New York, New York
 Yale University Art Gallery, New Haven, Connecticut

Solo exhibitions 

 1963: Dilexi Gallery, Los Angeles, CA
 1964: Exhibition of Paintings by Joe Goode, Rolf Nelson Gallery, Los Angeles, CA
 1966: Nicholas Wilder Gallery, Los Angeles, CA
 1967: English Still Life on White Tablecloth, Rowan Gallery, London, England
 1968: Kornblee Gallery, New York, NY
 1969: Nicholas Wilder Gallery, Los Angeles, CA
 1970: Galerie Neuendorf, Cologne, Germany
 1971: Galerie Neuendorf, Hamburg, Germany; Nicholas Wilder Gallery, Los Angeles, CA; La Jolla Museum of Contemporary Art, La Jolla, CA; Mueller Gallery, Dusseldorf, Germany; Wall Reliefs, Pomona College Art Gallery, Claremont, CA; Galleria Milano, Milan, Italy
 1972: Joe Goode, Texas Gallery, Houston, TX; Joe Goode, Felicity Samuel Gallery, London, England; Galerie Neuendorf, Cologne, Germany; Lithographs 1962-1972, Margo Leavin Gallery, Los Angeles, CA; Minneapolis Institute of the Arts, Minneapolis, MN; Nicholas Wilder Gallery, Los Angeles, CA; Recent Paintings, Corcoran and Corcoran, Coral Gables, FL; Contract Graphics, Houston, TX
 1973: New Drawings, Texas Gallery, Houston, TX; Cirrus Gallery, Los Angeles, CA; Felicity Samuel Gallery, London, England; Joe Goode: Work Until Now, Fort Worth Art Center Museum, Fort Worth, TX (Travelled to Contemporary Arts Museum, Houston, TX); Galerie Neuendorf, Hamburg, Germany; Margo Leavin Gallery, Los Angeles, CA
 1974: California State University, Northridge, CA; Vandalism Series, Nicholas Wilder Gallery, Los Angeles, CA; Vandalism (Lithographs), Cirrus Gallery, Los Angeles, CA
 1975: Galerie Neuendorf, Hamburg, Germany; Felicity Samuel Gallery, London, England; Nicholas Wilder Gallery, Los Angeles, CA
 1976: X-Ray Drawings, James Corcoran Gallery, Los Angeles, CA; Nicholas Wilder Gallery, Los Angeles, CA; Joe Goode: Recent Work, Washington University Gallery of Art, St. Louis, MO
 1977: A Selection of Paintings and Drawings, Mount Saint Mary’s College Art Gallery, Los Angeles, CA
 1978: Nicholas Wilder Gallery, Los Angeles, CA; Graphic Works Retrospective, Cirrus Gallery, Los Angeles, CA
 1979: Nicholas Wilder Gallery, Los Angeles, CA; Paintings, Drawings, Prints, Texas Gallery, Houston, TX
 1980: Joe Goode, Charles Cowles Gallery, New York, NY
 1981: Drawings 81, Margo Leavin Gallery, Los Angeles, CA; Recent Lithographs, Cirrus Gallery, Los Angeles, CA
 1982: Paintings: Environmental Impact Series, ARCO Center for Visual Art, Los Angeles, CA; Joe Goode: Paintings, Prints, Works on Paper, Gallery One, Fort Worth, TX
 1983: Retrospective of Graphic Works, Cirrus Gallery, Los Angeles, CA
 1984: Joe Goode: Forest Fire Impressions, Asher/Faure Gallery, Los Angeles, CA; Charles Cowles Gallery, New York, NY; Lithographs, Cunningham Memorial Art Gallery, Bakersfield, CA
 1985: Joe Goode: Paintings and Drawings, Braunstein Gallery, San Francisco, CA
 1986: James Corcoran Gallery, Santa Monica, CA; Joe Goode, Thomas Babeor Gallery, La Jolla, CA
 1987: Joe Goode: Milk Bottle Paintings 1961-1962, Pence Gallery, Santa Monica, CA
 1989: The Ocean Blues, Compass Rose Gallery, Chicago, IL; New Paintings: The Ocean Blue Series, James Corcoran Gallery, Santa Monica, CA
 1990: Joe Goode: Waterfall Paintings, James Corcoran Gallery, Santa Monica, CA
 1991: Joe Goode: From Blue and Black Series, Takada Gallery, San Francisco, CA
 1992: Joe Goode: New Paintings and Drawings, James Corcoran Gallery, Santa Monica, CA; Joe Goode, Karsten Greve Gallery, Paris, France; Laboratory: Joe Goode Tornado Triptych, The Los Angeles County Museum of Art, Los Angeles, CA; Joe Goode, Jack Tilton Gallery, New York, NY
 1993: Tornado Paintings and Works on Paper, Takada Gallery, San Francisco, CA; Tornadoes, Soma Gallery, San Diego, CA
 1994: Joe Goode: Pollution Paintings, LA Louver, Venice, CA; Shasta College, Redding, CA
 1995: Painting & Paper Work, Nantenshi Gallery, Tokyo, Japan
 1996: Global Warming: Pollution Paintings, LA Louver, Venice, CA
 1997: Joe Goode, Orange County Museum of Art, Newport Beach, CA; Joe Goode: Retrospective of Paper Works, Cirrus Gallery, Los Angeles, CA
 1998: Joe Goode: New Paintings, Takada Gallery, San Francisco, CA; Suns of Bitches, Moons of Dogs, LA Louver, Venice, CA; Works on Paper 1960-1973, Manny Silverman Gallery, Los Angeles, CA
 1999: Paintings, Peter Blake Gallery, Laguna Beach, CA; Joe Goode: Cause and Effect Paintings, Frederick Spratt Gallery, San Jose, CA
 2000: Recent Paintings, Franklin Parrasch Gallery, New York, NY; Joe Goode, LA Louver, Venice, CA
 2001: The Cloud Paintings, Manny Silverman Gallery, Los Angeles, CA; Peter Blake Gallery, Laguna Beach, CA
 2002: Cloud; Paintings from 1965 to Present, Stephen Wirtz Gallery, San Francisco, CA; Joe Goode, Texas Gallery, Houston, TX; LA Louver, Venice, CA; Peter Blake Gallery, Laguna Beach, CA; Plain Air, Bobbie Greenfield Gallery, Santa Monica, CA
 2003: New Paintings, Shoshana Wayne, Santa Monica, CA
 2004: Surface Paintings, Texas Gallery, Houston, TX
 2005: X-RAY DRAWINGS, Manny Silverman Gallery, Los Angeles, CA; BURN OUT!, Craig Krull Gallery, Santa Monica, CA; Joe Goode, Cirrus Gallery, Los Angeles, CA
 2007: New Work, Texas Gallery, Houston, TX
 2008: JOEDONTNO, Bernard Jacobson Gallery, London, England; Ashes, DNJ Gallery, Los Angeles, CA; Paint IS Nature, Seiler & Mosseri-Marlio Gallerie, Zurich, Switzerland
 2009: Joe Goode: Clouds, Paintings and Drawings from the 60’s and 70’s, Franklin Parrasch Gallery, New York, NY
 2010: Joe Goode, Texas Gallery, Houston, TX; Golden Dreams, Greenfield Sacks Gallery, Santa Monica, CA
 2011: Nighttime, Kohn Gallery, Los Angeles, CA
 2012: Joe Goode, Texas Gallery, Houston, TX
 2014: Joe Goode, Texas Gallery, Houston, TX; Flat Screen Nature, Kohn Gallery, Los Angeles, CA
 2015: There’s Always Tomorrow, Van Doren Waxter, New York, NY; Joe Goode, Contemporary Art Museum, St. Louis, MO; Tip of the Iceberg, Leslie Sacks Fine Art, Santa Monica, CA; Moonglows & Fireflies, Koki Arts, Tokyo, Japan
 2016: Joe Goode, Peter Blake Gallery, Laguna Beach, CA; Curtain Calls, Texas Gallery, Houston, TX
 2017: Joe Goode, Leslie Sacks Gallery, Santa Monica, CA; Old Ideas with New Solutions, Kohn Gallery, Los Angeles, CA
 2018: Joe Goode, Peter Blake Gallery, Laguna Beach, CA
 2019: Environmental Impacts, Leslie Sacks Gallery, Santa Monica, CA

Awards and grants

 American Foundation of Artists
 Cassandra Foundation
 Copley Foundation
 Maestro Grant, California Art Council
 National Endowment for the Arts

References

 Pop Art, Lucy R. Lippard, Praeger
 Pop Art Redefined, Barbara Rose, Praeger
 American Pop Art, Lawrence Alloway, Macmillan
 An Illustrated Dictionary of Pop, Jose Pierre, Barrons
 The Painter and The Photograph, Van Deren Coke, University of New Mexico Press
 The New Paintings, Udo Kulterman, Praeger
 California Art Review, Les Krantz, American References
 Who's Who in American Art, R.R. Bowker
 L.A. Pop in the Sixties, Ann Ayres, Newport Harbor Museum
 "Ashes" exhibition statement, DNJ Gallery

External links
 
 Joe Goode in the National Gallery of Australia's Kenneth Tyler collection
 Goode's Paintings on Artnet
 Goode at Cirrus Gallery

American pop artists
20th-century American painters
American male painters
21st-century American painters
American contemporary painters
1937 births
Living people
Artists from Los Angeles
20th-century American printmakers
20th-century American male artists